Laelantennus is a genus of mites in the family Laelapidae.

Species
 Laelantennus lagena Berlese, 1916

References

Laelapidae